Angels of Death is the third studio album by Canadian singer-songwriter Jennifer Castle. It was released on May 18, 2018 under Paradise of Bachelors.

Critical reception
Angels of Death was met with universal acclaim reviews from critics. At Metacritic, which assigns a weighted average rating out of 100 to reviews from mainstream publications, this release received an average score of 81, based on 7 reviews.

Track listing

References

2018 albums
Folk albums by Canadian artists